The 1960 European Cup final was the fifth final in the history of the European Cup, and was contested by Real Madrid of Spain and Eintracht Frankfurt of West Germany. Real won 7–3 in front of a crowd of over 127,000 people at Glasgow's Hampden Park stadium, still the highest attendance for a European Cup final. There were an estimated 70 million television viewers around Europe. Widely regarded as one of the greatest football matches ever played, it also remains the highest-scoring final in the history of the competition.

Frankfurt reached the final through an impressive 12–4 aggregate victory over Scottish champions Rangers, whereas Madrid overcame their bitter rivals Barcelona 6–2 over two legs.

The match was initially in doubt as the German Football Association had banned their clubs from taking part in matches with any team containing Ferenc Puskás after the Hungarian had alleged the West German team had used drugs in 1954. Puskás had to make a formal written apology before the match could take place.

Puskás and Di Stefano were two of only three players to have scored a hat-trick in a European Cup final, with Puskás being the only one to ever score four goals. The other was Pierino Prati for Milan in their 4–1 victory over Ajax in 1969. Puskás repeated the feat in 1962 but ended up losing to holders Benfica.

Route to the final

Match

Details

See also
1959–60 European Cup
Eintracht Frankfurt in European football
Real Madrid CF in international football competitions

Notes

References

External links
European Cup 1959/60 from UEFA
European Cup 1959/60 from RSSSF

1
1960
Real Madrid CF matches
Eintracht Frankfurt matches
International sports competitions in Glasgow
1960
1959–60 in Scottish football
1959–60 in Spanish football
1959–60 in German football
1960
May 1960 sports events in the United Kingdom
Football in Glasgow